Group Captain Mustapha A. Amin was the first governor of Borno State, Nigeria from March 1976 to July 1978 during the military regime of General Olusegun Obasanjo, after that state had been formed when North-Eastern State was divided into Bauchi, Borno, and Gongola states.

Amin was a Group Captain in the Nigerian Airforce when appointed governor by the supreme military council.
In an attempt to stop desert encroachment, he imposed restriction on tree cutting permits and made it an offence to set fires to clear the land.
He called for establishment on an inland port to serve Lake Chad.

References

Year of birth missing
2013 deaths
Nigerian Air Force officers
Nigerian Muslims
Governors of Borno State